The Birdrong Sandstone is an Early Cretaceous (Hauterivian to Barremian) geologic formation of the Barrow Group in Western Australia. Dinosaur remains are among the fossils that have been recovered from the formation, although none have yet been referred to a specific genus.

Description 
The formation overlies the Kockatea Shale, Forestier Claystone and Zeepaard Formation and is overlain by the Muderong Shale, Windalia Radiolarite and Tamala Limestone. At its type section at Mardathuna Station, northeast of Carnarvon, the Birdrong Sandstone begins with a fluvial phase of deposition, followed by deltaic and shallow marine facies.

Fossil content 
The following fossils were reported from the formation:

 Dinosaurs
 Tetanurae indet.
 Theropoda indet.
 Sauropterygia
 Leptocleidus clemai
 Leptocleidus sp.

See also 
 List of dinosaur-bearing rock formations
 List of stratigraphic units with indeterminate dinosaur fossils
 South Polar region of the Cretaceous

References

Bibliography 

 
  

Geologic formations of Australia
Cretaceous System of Australia
Early Cretaceous Australia
Barremian Stage
Hauterivian Stage
Sandstone formations
Deltaic deposits
Fluvial deposits
Shallow marine deposits
Paleontology in Australia
Geology of Western Australia